Chamorchis is a genus of flowering plants from the orchid family, Orchidaceae. It contains only one known species, Chamorchis alpina, known as the false orchid or false musk orchid, and found in subarctic and subalpine parts of Europe: Scandinavia, the Alps, the Carpathians, northern European Russia.

See also 
 List of Orchidaceae genera

References 

 Pridgeon, A.M., Cribb, P.J., Chase, M.A. & Rasmussen, F. eds. (2001). Genera Orchidacearum 2. Oxford Univ. Press.
 Berg Pana, H. 2005. Handbuch der Orchideen-Namen. Dictionary of Orchid Names. Dizionario dei nomi delle orchidee. Ulmer, Stuttgart

External links 
 
 
 AHO Bayern, Zwergorchis Chamorchis alpina 
 Orchidées Nature, Chamorchis alpina
 Fancy Plants, Zwergorchis (Chamorchis)
 Flore Alpes, Orchis nain, Chamorchis alpina

Orchideae genera
Orchids of Europe
Orchideae
Monotypic Orchidoideae genera